Owen Williams (1873 – after 1896) was an English footballer who played in the Football League for West Bromwich Albion.

References

1873 births
Date of death missing
English footballers
Association football inside forwards
English Football League players
West Bromwich Albion F.C. players